The Canal des Deux Mers has been used to describe two different but similar things since the 1660s.  In some cases, it is used interchangeably with the Canal du Midi.  In others, it describes the path from the Atlantic to the Mediterranean, of which the Canal du Midi was the first man-made component.

Route
The route from the Atlantic to the Mediterranean includes, from west to east, in sequence:
Enter the Gironde estuary from the Atlantic  
Gironde estuary is formed by the confluence of the Dordogne and the Garonne
Gironde estuary continues into the Garonne 
The river Garonne connects to the Garonne Lateral Canal at Castets-en-Dorthe
Garonne Lateral Canal terminates in Toulouse and connects to the Canal du Midi
Canal du Midi begins in Toulouse, and there are two paths available from it to the Mediterranean.
Path 1 - Turn off Canal du Midi and join the
Canal de Jonction which connects into the river Aude
Aude connects to Canal de la Robine
Canal de la Robine flows into the Mediterranean Sea
Path 2 - Continue to end of Canal du Midi and continue into the
Étang de Thau which joins to the Canal du Rhône à Sète
Canal du Rhône à Sète flows into the Mediterranean Sea

References

Deux 
Canal du Midi